Brian Allen (born October 11, 1995) is an American football center for the Los Angeles Rams of the National Football League (NFL). He played college football at Michigan State. He was drafted by the Rams in the fourth round of the 2018 NFL Draft. He was the first active NFL player to test positive for COVID-19. Allen was named an alternate to the 2022 Pro Bowl.

College career
Allen played college football for Michigan State University. Allen played with his older brother and his younger brother during his collegiate career. He was a 3 time all Big Ten selection as well as a freshman all American.

Professional career

Los Angeles Rams
Allen was selected by the Los Angeles Rams in the fourth round (111th overall) of the 2018 NFL Draft, using the pick acquired in the Robert Quinn trade. He played in 13 games his rookie year as a backup.

In 2019, Allen was named the starting center following the departure of veteran John Sullivan. He started the first nine games before suffering an MCL injury in Week 10. He was placed on injured reserve on November 12, 2019. On April 15, 2020, the Rams announced that Allen was the first NFL player to test positive for COVID-19.

In 2021, Allen helped the Rams reach Super Bowl LVI where they would defeat the Cincinnati Bengals 23-20.

On March 14, 2022, Allen signed a three-year extension with the Rams worth $24 million.

Personal life 
His older brother Jack is also a center who signed a free agent deal with the New Orleans Saints in 2016.

References

External links
Michigan State Spartans bio

1995 births
Living people
American football centers
American football offensive guards
Los Angeles Rams players
Michigan State Spartans football players
People from Hinsdale, Illinois
Players of American football from Illinois
Sportspeople from Cook County, Illinois
Sportspeople from DuPage County, Illinois